Eufijia is a genus of flies in the family Stratiomyidae.

Species
Eufijia albicornis Bezzi, 1928
Eufijia dimidiata Bezzi, 1928
Eufijia flavinervis Bezzi, 1928
Eufijia ovalis James, 1950
Eufijia tarsalis Bezzi, 1928
Eufijia tibialis Bezzi, 1928

References

Stratiomyidae
Brachycera genera
Taxa named by Mario Bezzi
Diptera of Australasia